Henri Honoré Giraud (18 January 1879 – 11 March 1949) was a French general and a leader of the Free French Forces during the Second World War until he was forced to retire in 1944.

Born to an Alsatian family in Paris, Giraud graduated from the Saint-Cyr military academy and served in French North Africa. He was wounded and captured by the Germans during the First World War, but managed to escape from his prisoner-of-war camp. During the interwar period, Giraud returned to North Africa and fought in the Rif War, for which he was awarded the Légion d'honneur.

Early in the Second World War, Giraud fought in the Netherlands. In May 1940, he was again captured by the Germans, but made another successful escape from captivity in April 1942 after two years of careful planning. From within Vichy France he worked with the Allies in secret, and assumed command of French troops in North Africa after Operation Torch (November 1942) following the assassination of François Darlan. In January 1943, he took part in the Casablanca Conference along with Charles de Gaulle, Winston Churchill and Franklin D. Roosevelt. Later in the same year, Giraud and de Gaulle became co-presidents of the French Committee of National Liberation, but he lost support and retired in frustration in April 1944.

After the war, Giraud was elected to the Constituent Assembly of the French Fourth Republic. He died in Dijon in 1949.

Early life 

Henri Giraud was born in Paris, of Alsatian descent, and was the son of a coal merchant.

Military career 
He graduated from the Saint-Cyr Military Academy in 1900 and joined the French Army as a sub-lieutenant in the 4th Zouaves. In 1907, he qualified for admission to the École supérieure de guerre, and on 10 December was transferred to the 27th Infantry. Having successfully qualified as a staff officer, he was appointed to the staff of the 9th Army Corps on 13 October 1909. On 23 October 1911, he was appointed to the staff of the 1st Brigade of Cuirassiers. Due to the slow pace of promotion in the peacetime army, he only received a brevet promotion to captain on 23 December 1912, over a decade after his promotion to lieutenant. On 23 June 1913, Giraud returned to the 4th Zouaves, and commanded Zouave troops in North Africa until he was transferred back to France in 1914 when World War I broke out.

World War I 
Giraud was seriously wounded while leading a Zouave bayonet charge during the Battle of St. Quentin on 30 August 1914, and was left for dead on the field. He was captured by the Germans and placed in a prison camp in Belgium. He managed to escape two months later by pretending to be a roustabout with a traveling circus. He then asked Edith Cavell for help, and eventually he was able to return to France via the Netherlands, with assistance from Cavell's team. His feat earned him appointment as a knight of the Legion of Honour on 10 April 1915. With effect from 26 February 1915, he was reappointed a staff officer.

Afterwards, Giraud served with French troops in Istanbul under General Franchet d'Esperey.

Interbellum
In 1920 Giraud was transferred to Morocco to fight against Rif rebels. He was awarded the Légion d'Honneur after the capture of Abd-el-Krim (1926). On 20 October 1927, by now a brevet colonel with the 5th Infantry, he was appointed professor of infantry tactics at the École de Guerre, where one of his students was Captain Charles de Gaulle. On 3 February 1930, Giraud was "placed at the disposal of the resident-general of France in Morocco", then Lucien Saint, and was assigned to monitor the Algerian-Moroccan borders as commander of the Moroccan frontier post of Boudenib. He was promoted to brigadier-general on 22 December 1930. On 11 April 1936, he was appointed military governor of Metz, commanding the 6th military region.

World War II: command, capture and escape 

When World War II began, Giraud was a member of the Superior War Council, and disagreed with Charles de Gaulle about the tactics of using armoured troops. He became the commander of the 7th Army when it was sent to the Netherlands on 10 May 1940 and was able to delay German troops at Breda on 13 May. Subsequently, the depleted 7th Army was merged with the 9th. While trying to block a German attack through the Ardennes, he was at the front with a reconnaissance patrol when he was captured by German troops at Wassigny on 19 May. A court-martial tried Giraud for ordering the execution of two German saboteurs wearing civilian clothes but he was acquitted and taken to Königstein Castle near Dresden, which was used as a high-security POW prison.

Giraud planned his escape carefully over two years. He learned German and memorised a map of the area. He made a  rope out of twine, torn bedsheets, and copper wire, which friends had smuggled into the prison for him. Using a simple code embedded in his letters home, he informed his family of his plans to escape. On 17 April 1942, he lowered himself down the cliff of the mountain fortress. He had shaved off his moustache and wearing a Tyrolean hat, travelled to Schandau to meet his Special Operations Executive (SOE) contact who provided him with a change of clothes, cash and identity papers. Through various ruses, he reached the Swiss border by train. To avoid border guards who were on the alert for him, he walked through the mountains until he was stopped by two Swiss soldiers, who took him to Basel. Giraud eventually slipped into Vichy France, where he made his identity known. He tried to convince Marshal Pétain that Germany would lose, and that France must resist the German occupation. His views were rejected but the Vichy government refused to return Giraud to the Germans.

Cooperation with the Allies 

Giraud's escape was soon known all over France. Pierre Laval tried to persuade him to return to Germany. Yet while remaining loyal to Pétain and the Vichy government, Giraud refused to cooperate with the Germans. In retaliation, Heinrich Himmler ordered the Gestapo to try to assassinate him and to arrest any members of Giraud's family that could be found, who would be held hostage in order to discourage Giraud from cooperating with the Allies. Seventeen members of Giraud's extended family were arrested.

He was secretly contacted by the Allies, who gave him the code name Kingpin. Giraud was already planning for the day when American troops landed in France. He agreed to support an Allied landing in French North Africa, provided that only American troops were used (like many other French officers he was bitterly resentful of the British, particularly after their attack on Mers-el-Kébir), and that he or another French officer was the commander of such an operation. He considered this latter condition essential to maintaining French sovereignty and authority over the Arab and Berber natives of North Africa.

Giraud designated General Charles Mast as his representative in Algeria. At a secret meeting on 23 October with U.S. General Mark W. Clark and diplomat Robert Daniel Murphy, the invasion was agreed on, but the Americans promised only that Giraud would be in command "as soon as possible". Giraud, still in France, responded with a demand for a written commitment that he would be commander within 48 hours of the landing, and for landings in France as well as North Africa. Giraud also insisted that he could not leave France before 20 November.

However, Giraud was persuaded that he had to go. He requested to be fetched by airplane, but General Dwight Eisenhower advised that he should be brought to Gibraltar by the British submarine , masquerading as "USS Seraph" under the nominal command of American Captain Jerauld Wright, as no US submarines were operating in the vicinity. On 5 November, he and his two sons were picked up near Toulon by HMS Seraph and taken to meet Eisenhower in Gibraltar. He arrived on 7 November, only a few hours before the landings.

Eisenhower asked him to assume command of French troops in North Africa during Operation Torch and order them to join the Allies. But Giraud had expected to command the whole operation, and adamantly refused to participate on any other basis. He said "his honor would be tarnished" and that he would only be a spectator in the affair.

However, by the next morning, Giraud relented. He refused to leave immediately for Algiers, but rather stayed in Gibraltar until 9 November. When asked why he did not go to Algiers he replied: "You may have seen something of the large De Gaullist demonstration that was held here last Sunday. Some of the demonstrators sang the Marseillaise. I entirely approve of that! Others sang the Chant du départ [a military ballad]. Quite satisfactory! Others again shouted 'Vive de Gaulle!' No objection. But some of them cried 'Death to Giraud!' I don't approve of that at all."

Pro-Allied elements in Algeria had agreed to support the Allied landings, and in fact seized Algiers on the night of 7–8 November; the city was then occupied by Allied troops. However, resistance continued at Oran and Casablanca. Giraud flew to Algiers on 9 November, but his attempt to assume command of French forces was rebuffed; his broadcast directing French troops to cease resistance and join the Allies was ignored. Instead, it appeared that Admiral François Darlan, who happened to be in Algiers, had real authority, and Giraud quickly realized this. Despite the fact that Darlan was the de facto head of the Vichy government, the Allies recognized him as head of French forces in Africa, and on 10 November, after agreeing to a deal, Darlan ordered the French forces to cease fire and join the Allies.

On 11 November, German forces occupied southern France. Negotiations continued in Algiers, and by 13 November, Darlan was recognized as High Commissioner of French North Africa and West Africa, while Giraud was appointed commander of all French forces under Darlan.

All this took place without reference to the Free French organization of De Gaulle, which had claimed to be the legitimate government of France in exile.

Then on 24 December 1942, Darlan was assassinated in mysterious circumstances. On that afternoon, the admiral drove to his offices at the Palais d'Été and was shot down at the door to his bureau by a young man of 20, Bonnier de la Chapelle, a monarchist. The young man was tried by court martial under Giraud's orders and executed on the 26th. With the strong backing of the Allies, especially Eisenhower, Giraud was elected to succeed Darlan.

Army of Africa leader 

After Admiral Darlan's assassination, Giraud became his de facto successor with Allied support. This occurred through a series of consultations between Giraud and Charles de Gaulle. De Gaulle wanted to pursue a political position in France and agreed to have Giraud as commander-in-chief, as the more militarily qualified of the two. Giraud took part in the Casablanca conference, with Roosevelt, Churchill and de Gaulle, in January 1943. Later, after very difficult negotiations, Giraud agreed to suppress the racist laws, and to liberate Vichy prisoners from the South Algerian concentration camps. Henri Giraud and Charles de Gaulle then became co-presidents of the French Committee of National Liberation and Free French Forces. Giraud wanted to keep all racial laws. In the US, he praised the achievements of Nazi Germany. The Cremieux decree was only restored by General de Gaulle. De Gaulle consolidated his political position at Giraud's expense because he was more up to date with the political situation. Giraud went to the U.S. in July on a useless trip while de Gaulle gained strength. Giraud made a fool of himself in Detroit with a speech praising Nazi achievements in Germany.

Following the Resistance uprising in Corsica on 11 September 1943, Giraud sent an expedition, including two French destroyers, to help the resistance movement without informing the committee. This drew more criticism from de Gaulle, and he lost the co-presidency in November 1943.

When the Allies found out that Giraud was maintaining his own intelligence network, the French committee forced him from his post as a commander-in-chief of the French forces. He refused to accept a post of Inspector General of the Army and chose to retire after forty-four years' service. On 10 March 1944 he received a telegram from Winston Churchill offering Churchill's sympathy for the death of Giraud's daughter who had been captured in Tunisia, and carried off into Germany with her four children. On 28 August 1944, he survived an assassination attempt in Algeria.

Postwar life 
On 2 June 1946, he was elected to the French Constituent Assembly as a representative of the Republican Party of Liberty and helped to create the constitution of the Fourth Republic. He remained a member of the War Council and was decorated for his escape. He published two books, Mes Evasions (My Escapes, 1946) and Un seul but, la victoire: Alger 1942–1944 (A Single Goal, Victory: Algiers 1942–1944, 1949) about his experiences.

Henri Giraud died in Dijon, France, on 11 March 1949.

Military ranks 

Legion d'Honneur 1926

Decorations
  Academic Officer (Silver Palms) (July 1929)
  War Cross 1914-1918
  War Cross 1939-1945
  War Cross for Foreign Theatres of Operations
  Escapees' Medal (12 October 1927)
  1914–1918 Inter-Allied Victory medal (France)
  1914–1918 Commemorative war medal (France)

See also
 Liberation of France
 Operation Kingpin (World War II)

References

Notes

Further reading 
 Giraud, Henri Honoré. Mes évasions, Paris: Julliard, 1946, 254pp; also Hachette, 1949.
 Bell, P. M. H. "War, foreign policy and public opinion: Britain and the Darlan affair, November–December 1942." Journal of Strategic Studies 5.3 (1982): 393–415.
 Funk, Arthur Layton. The politics of TORCH: the allied landings and the Algiers Putsch, 1942 (University Press of Kansas, 1974).
 Ranfurly, Hermione, Countess of (1995) To War With Whitaker: The Wartime Diaries of the Countess of Ranfurly, 1939–1945 Manderin Paperbacks, 1994, 
 Thomas, Martin. "The Discarded Leader: General Henri Giraud and the Foundation of the French Committee of National Liberation." French History 10.1 (1996): 86–111.
 Ward Price, George. Giraud and the African Scene, New York, NY: MacMillan, 1944, p. 260.

1879 births
1949 deaths
Politicians from Paris
French generals
Republican Party of Liberty politicians
Members of the Constituent Assembly of France (1946)
People of the Rif War
French military personnel of World War I
French military personnel of World War II
World War II prisoners of war held by Germany
French escapees
Charles de Gaulle
Escapees from German detention
French prisoners of war in World War I
École Spéciale Militaire de Saint-Cyr alumni
World War I prisoners of war held by Germany
French prisoners of war in World War II
Grand Croix of the Légion d'honneur